The Kentucky Karma was a team in the Women's Football Alliance. Based in Louisville, the Karma played their home games at South Oldham High School in Crestwood, Kentucky, approximately 20 miles northeast of Louisville. From 2005 to 2008, the Karma played in the National Women's Football Association. In 2009, they changed leagues and played in the Women's Football Alliance for 2 years, and subsequently folded in 2011.

Season-by-season

|-
| colspan="6" align="center" | Kentucky Karma (NWFA)
|-
|2005 || 5 || 3 || 0 || 8th North || --
|-
|2006 || 5 || 3 || 0 || 2nd South Central || Lost NWFA First Round (St. Louis)
|-
|2007 || 4 || 4 || 0 || 3rd South North || --
|-
|2008 || 6 || 2 || 0 || 1st South East || Won Southern Conference Quarterfinal (Pensacola)Forfeited Southern Conference Semifinal (Los Angeles)
|-
| colspan="6" align="center" | Kentucky Karma (WFA)
|-
|2009 || 5 || 3 || 0 || 2nd National Mid-Atlantic || --
|-
|2010 || 2 || 6 || 0 || 3rd National Central || --
|-
|2011 || 1 || 7 || 0 || 3rd National North Central 1 || --
|-
!Totals || 29 || 30 || 0
|colspan="2"| (including playoffs)

2009

Season schedule

2010

Season schedule

2011

Standings

Season schedule

** = Forfeited

External links
KY Karma stats

Women's Football Alliance teams
Defunct sports teams in Louisville, Kentucky
American football teams in Kentucky
American football teams established in 2005
Women's sports in Kentucky
2005 establishments in Kentucky
Women in Kentucky
Crestwood, Kentucky